The Unfinished Supper (Latvian: Nepabeigtās vakariņas) is a 1979 Latvian police film about Martin Beck, directed by Jānis Streičs, based on the novel Murder at the Savoy (1970).

Cast
Romualds Ancāns as Martin Beck
Ingrīda Andriņa as Anna
Lilita Bērziņa as Fru Grengren
Pauls Butkēvičs as Backlund
Jānis Paukštello as Benny Skacke
Lilita Ozoliņa as Sonya
Ivars Kalniņš as Mats Linder

References

External links

Незаконченный ужин 
Nepabeigtās vakariņas 

Soviet crime drama films
Martin Beck films
Latvian drama films
1979 films
1979 crime drama films
Soviet-era Latvian films
1970s Swedish films